The Yunlin County Council (YLCC) is the elected county council of Yunlin County, Republic of China. The council composes of 43 councilors lastly elected through the 2022 Republic of China local election on 26 November 2022.

History
The current county council building was completed and started its operation on 27 September 2001.

Architecture
The county council building has a 1,090 m2 area of session room. There is also a 4,000 m2 Democracy Square in front of the building.

Transportation
The council is accessible from south west of Douliu Station of Taiwan Railways.

See also
 Yunlin County Government

References

External links

  

County councils of Taiwan
Yunlin County